Zumrud Guluzadeh (17 March 1932 – 26 September 2021) was an Azerbaijani professor of philosophy at the Azerbaijan National Academy of Sciences.

Zumrud Guluzadeh authored many books on philosophy in the Azerbaijani, Turkish, English, and Russian languages.

Notes

References

1932 births
2021 deaths
Azerbaijani philosophers
Azerbaijani professors
Azerbaijani women academics
Azerbaijani women writers
Writers from Baku
Azerbaijani educators
Philosophy writers